Urtica ferox, commonly known as tree nettle and in Māori: ongaonga, taraonga, taraongaonga, оr okaoka, is a species of nettle endemic to New Zealand. It has large spines that can result in a painful sting that lasts several days.

Ongaonga is the main source of food for larvae of the New Zealand red admiral butterfly or kahukura, Vanessa gonerilla.

Description
U. ferox can grow to a height of 3 m (9.8 ft) with the base of the stem reaching 12 cm (4.7 in) in thickness. These spines are prominent along the salient mid-vein and leaf margin. This nettle is winter deciduous in cold climates, evergreen in mild climates and can lose its leaves in drought conditions if it is growing in shallow soils.

Flowering occurs from November to March and because U. ferox is a dioecious shrub it will cross pollinate, with transferral between the flowers enabled by the wind. Pollen grains are collected by the densely packed stigmas on the flowers and seed dispersal is carried out by rolling, wind, and by birds. The fruit, which are achenes, mature in January, each containing one 1.5 mm long, brown coloured, ovoid-shaped seed which takes one month to germinate. In his study on the germination behaviour of 5 different vascular seeding species, C. J. Burrows found that U. ferox had the lowest germination rate of 59% compared to >85% for the other similar species. He surmised that it is capable of building up a large seed bank in the soil which may survive for several years, citing that European species in the genus Urtica produce seed banks.

Toxin
The toxin present in the spines is triffydin (or tryfydin). This toxin contains histamine, serotonin and acetylcholine, the latter causing powerful stimulation of the parasympathetic nerve system. Multiple stingings can have a very painful reaction which causes inflammation, a rash, and itching. In high concentrations it can also cause: loss of motor movement, paralysis, drop in blood pressure, convulsions, blurred vision, confusion and in extreme cases, death.

Acute polyneuropathy can occur due to U. ferox stings; and there has been one recorded human death from contact—a lightly clad hunter who died five hours after walking through a dense patch. There is also one other likely death, with the mystery of the death only being solved by the pathologist years afterwards.

Distribution and habitat
U. ferox is endemic to New Zealand and inhabits coastal and lowland forests and shrublands in the North, South, and Stewart Islands. It is commonly found in clearings or forest margins, often forming large patches, from 0–600 m above sea level. It has also been recorded on the Hen and Chicken Islands along stream-beds.

Ecology
Although U. ferox is a toxic shrub, it also plays a significant part in the phenology of a native butterfly, namely the red admiral (Vanessa gonerilla). The leaves of the tree nettle is the preferred food and provide protection for the butterfly larvae. When the larvae arrives in the leaves, it will curve the tip of nettle leaf, use the silken threads to make the leaves stick together, and construct a secure place where it can eat the food. Due to the caterpillar's activities, the leaves of shrub can fall off. The eggs of butterflies, also including the yellow admiral (Vanessa itea), are laid on the leaves of nettle during the spring and summer. It takes eight to ten days for the eggs to incubate. Beside these butterflies, some mammalian pests also eat the leaves of tree nettle, like the Common brushtail possum, goats and deer. However, because no non-flying, non-marine mammals existed in New Zealand prior to human arrival in the last one thousand years, it is unadapted for them.

U. ferox requires high nutrient levels found in cycling forest systems such as those found in native New Zealand forest. In these environments an “A type” soil horizon of rich leaf litter and humus between 10 – 80 cm is common. This is significant as the species doesn't directly compete with other flora, this is achieved through inhabiting the boundary zones between strata, therefore the high soil fertility. Like other species in the nettle family it grows well in soils with high nutrient levels; especially in high quantities of nitrogen. Access to open sunlight and rainwater results in a rapidly growing plant able to take advantage of natural tree fall and other natural events such as land slides and flooding which clear dominating old growth species.

Cultural uses
In Māori folklore, Kupe was said to have placed several obstacles to hinder pursuers whose wives he had stolen, one of which was the ongaonga.

Tree nettle has been eaten, and used medicinally. Māori used the bark of tree nettle and the leaves of kawakawa, boiled together, to make a liquid that can be used internally and externally for eczema and venereal disease. Also, the leaves of tree nettle play a significant part in the treating of pains. The decoction of leaves and young twigs dipped in boiled water is said to have been used for stomach ache and as treatment for gonorrhea. Urtica ferox was also a food source for Māori. The inner stems were sometimes consumed after the leaves and outer bark had been removed, the thin film that makes up the inner bark was also eaten raw and is said to have a sweet taste, it is also documented that stems were cooked after having the leaves removed.

See also
 List of poisonous plants

References

Further reading

Trees of New Zealand
ferox
Endemic flora of New Zealand
Dioecious plants